The Eastern Pilbara lined ctenotus or Pilbara ctenotus (Ctenotus duricola)  is a species of skink found in Western Australia.

References

duricola
Reptiles described in 1975
Taxa named by Glen Milton Storr